"Games Ponies Play" is the twelfth episode of the third season of My Little Pony: Friendship Is Magic as well as the 64th overall. Directed by James Wootton and written by Dave Polsky, "Games Ponies Play" premiered on The Hub on February 9, 2013. Occurring during the events of the previous episode, "Just for Sidekicks", the episode featured Twilight Sparkle, Rainbow Dash, Fluttershy, Pinkie Pie and Applejack trying to convince an inspector to host the Equestria Games at the Crystal Empire.

Plot 
Twilight and her friends go to the Crystal Empire, which is due to be inspected to host the Equestria Games, the biggest sporting event in all of Equestria. They leave all of their pets behind at home with Spike. Upon arrival, they meet Princess Cadance in a spa. While they enjoy the amenities of the spa, a messenger arrives to tell Princess Cadance that the inspector of the games, Ms. Harshwhinny, is due to arrive in fifteen minutes, much earlier than expected. This causes the ponies to panic, but Twilight manages to calm down the situation and tells Rarity to do the heardress of Cadance. The others go to the train station. Once a yellow pony steps out of the train, Twilight and her friends think that she is Ms. Harshwhinny and go to welcome her.

The friends show the inspector the castle, who seems to have claustrophobia and altocelarophobia. Therefore, she is eager to go outside the castle, but Twilight and her friends perform a cheer before going outside to properly welcome the inspector, who seems to be surprised that Cadance knows her. After leaving the castle, the friends take the inspector to the newly built stadium. The inspector is so happy to be outside, that she runs across the track and says that she is enjoying her vacation. After this, the friends realize that they got the wrong pony: Ms. Peachbottom.

Twilight and her friends leave Ms. Peachbottom behind and rush to the train station, but Ms. Harshwhinny has already arrived and is having a "hooficure" at the spa. She complains to Cadance that no one welcomed her into the empire, which leads to Rainbow Dash confessing that they welcomed the wrong pony. After hearing the story of Ms. Peachbottom, the inspector announces the Crystal Empire as the next host of the Equestria Games. The enthusiasm of the Crystal Ponies supercharge the Crystal Heart, which sends a beam of light into the sky.

As the friends board the train to go back to home, Applejack hears something growling. Spike, The Cutie Mark Crusaders and the six pets are shown hiding under the seats, depicting the climax of "Just for Sidekicks".

Reception 
Ethan Lewis of Den of Geek called the episode both "highly unusual" and "wonderful", praising how the episode "manage[d] to sneak in a couple lessons". Unleash the Fanboy Daniel Alvarez gave "Games Ponies Play" 4.5 out of 5 stars, calling it a "pretty solid" and "really great episode". He remarked it as one of the best season 3 episodes, complimenting the story, character moments and appearances of Princess Cadance.

Home media 
The episode was included in two releases by Shout! Factory: Princess Twilight Sparkle and Games Ponies Play.

Notes

References

External links 

My Little Pony: Friendship Is Magic episodes
2012 American television episodes
2012 Canadian television episodes